Uchqoʻrgʻon is a district of Namangan Region in Uzbekistan. The capital lies at the city Uchqoʻrgʻon. Its area is 300 km2. Its population is 174,600 (2021 est.).

The district consists of one city (Uchqoʻrgʻon), 4 urban-type settlements (Qayqi, Qoʻgʻay, Uchyogʻoch, Yangiobod) and 8 rural communities.

References 

Districts of Uzbekistan
Namangan Region